Bobby Yeah is a British stop motion animated short horror film written, directed and animated by Robert Morgan. It was made independently and completed in 2011.

The film premiered at the London International Animation Festival, and went on to screen at numerous international film festivals, including The Sundance Film Festival.

Bobby Yeah was nominated for the 2012 BAFTA Award for Best Short Animation.

Synopsis
A subhuman, rabbit-like creature named Bobby Yeah returns to his dark home with a hairy worm-like pet that he apparently stole. He notices a red button on its body and pushes it, resulting in two polyp creatures attached to metal boxes to spontaneously appear in his room. One of them begins to spew small red sperm seeds onto the floor and Bobby is forced to grab the polyp's long tongue and yank it out, killing it. The worm opens its tail and sucks up all the sperm to produce an egg. The egg hatches to reveal a small hairy creature that Bobby tucks in, only for it to morph into a giant disgusting baby head that kills the worm. The baby head knocks Bobby onto its back where he sees another button and pushes it, sending across a large field in broad daylight towards a metal box house.

Bobby finds himself in a room with pink fur walls where a face on a wall and a small winged baby interrogate him over the theft of the worm. After reluctantly admitting to the deed, as well as the worm's death, the baby produces a second head from its body that spits a button onto the face and Bobby's chest. A small finger scorpion and tall armless, bird-headed creature enter the room to attack Bobby. He manages to kill both of the grunts and the baby before escaping through the hole he came in through.

Bobby returns home exhausted and tired until the giant baby head and surviving polyp, now donned in police bobby helmets, enter the house. A gollywog head bursts through the door and spits out a hooded man, an executioner and a guillotine from its mouth. At the beckoning of the worm, Bobby pushes the button on his chest, produces hairs on his head and transforms into an octopus creature, killing everyone in the room. The face returns to laugh at Bobby's fate, but he uses his tentacles to gouge its eyes out and then pushes the button on his face. Sperm enters through an orifice in Bobby who then gives birth to a deformed being with eyes and tentacles. The offspring caresses Bobby's head before removing it from his body, though he is still alive. He lifts the head up as it floats away through a hole in the ceiling. The offspring waves goodbye as Bobby's head continues to float onward into a purple void.

Awards
Best Animated Short - Fantasia Film Festival , 2011 
Bronze Audience Award for Best Short Film - Fantasia Film Festival, 2011 
Best British Film - London Animation Festival, 2011 
Best Animated Short - Fantaspoa Fantasy FIlm Festival, 2011 
Best Horror Film - London Short Film Festival, 2012 
Special Jury Prize - Clermont Ferrand Short Film Festival, 2012 
BAFTA Nomination for Best Animated Short, 2012 
Special Jury Award - Animafest Zagreb, 2012 
 Grand Prize - Toronto Animated Arts Festival, 2012 
 Best Animation - Tabor Film Festival, 2012 
 Best Animation - New Horizons International Film Festival, 2012 
 Best Animation - Mile High Horror Film Festival, 2012 
 Best Short Animation - Lausanne Underground Film and Music Festival, 2012

References

External links
Official website
Bobby Yeah review at Fangoria.com
Bobby Yeah review at Film Threat
Article on the film at Take One

2011 animated films
2011 films
British animated films
2010s British films